The ICW Tag Team Championship is a professional wrestling Championship (professional wrestling) owned by Scotland's Insane Championship Wrestling promotion. Complimenting ICW's two established singles titles (ICW World Heavyweight Championship and ICW Zero-G Championship), the Tag Team Championship was first established on September 2, 2012 when The S.T.I (Dickie Divers and William Grange) won a tournament final to become the inaugural champions.

The titles were defended outside of the United Kingdom for the first time on 29 February 2016 at a show in Dublin, Ireland.  The current championships are KoE (Adam King and Marcus King) who are in their first reign.  They defeated Glasgow Grindhouse (Krieger and Lou King Sharp) at Fear and Loathing XIV.

Overall, there have been 26 reigns among 18 teams and 32 individuals with three vacancies.  One of the vacancies came on 27 July 2014 when the Bucky Boys were forced to vacate the championship due to Davey Boy suffering a knee injury.

Title history

Combined reigns

By team

By wrestler

See also
Insane Championship Wrestling
ICW World Heavyweight Championship
ICW Zero-G Championship
ICW Women's Championship

References

External links
 ICW Tag Team Championship

Insane Championship Wrestling championships
Tag team wrestling championships